Jean-Paul Ndeki (born 27 October 1982 in Cameroon) is a footballer who last plays for Al-Quwa Al-Jawiya.

His brother, Edouard Oum Ndeki, was a professional footballer who played in Turkey and Greece.

References

External links

1982 births
Living people
Cameroonian footballers
Cameroonian expatriate footballers
Expatriate footballers in Latvia
Expatriate footballers in Germany
Cameroonian expatriate sportspeople in China
Cameroonian expatriate sportspeople in Germany
Expatriate footballers in China
Qingdao Hainiu F.C. (1990) players
Eintracht Frankfurt players
Eintracht Frankfurt II players
AEP Paphos FC players
FK Ventspils players
Cypriot First Division players
Expatriate footballers in Cyprus
FK Venta players
Association football central defenders